Hilara media is a species of flies belonging to the family Empididae.

It is native to Great Britain.

References

Empididae
Asilomorph flies of Europe
Insects described in 1927